Daniel Nucci (born September 15, 1968) is an American actor. He is best known for his supporting roles in blockbuster films, including his roles as Danny Rivetti in Crimson Tide (1995), Lieutenant Shepard in The Rock (1996), Deputy Monroe in Eraser (1996), and Fabrizio de Rossi in Titanic (1997), as well as his lead role as Mike Foster in the Freeform series The Fosters (2013–2018).

Personal life
Born in Klagenfurt, Austria, to a French Moroccan mother and an Italian father, Nucci was raised in Italy until the age of seven, when his family relocated to the United States.

After temporarily living in Queens, New York, the family settled in the San Fernando Valley of California, where Nucci graduated from Grant High School. He married Terre Bridgham in 1995, and they had a daughter before their divorce in 1998. He played lovers with Paula Marshall in the 1997 film That Old Feeling; they married in 2003, and have a daughter.

Career
During the 1990s, Nucci played characters who are unceremoniously killed off in three blockbuster films — Eraser, The Rock and Titanic (as Fabrizio De Rossi, Jack Dawson's Italian friend) — which were released within 20 months of each other between 1996 and 1997. His character in Alive (also known as Alive: The Miracle of the Andes) (1993) survives.

Elsewhere in film, he starred as Spider Bomboni in Book of Love (1990) and as Petty Officer Danny Rivetti in the Gene Hackman-Denzel Washington thriller Crimson Tide (1995). He played the roles of Benny Rodriguez in the straight-to-video film The Sandlot: Heading Home (2007) and a Port Authority police officer in World Trade Center (2006).

Nucci appeared as Gabriel Ortega on the CBS soap opera Falcon Crest from 1988 to 1989, and as Vincent Sforza in the television miniseries Firestarter 2: Rekindled (2002). Other notable TV appearances include Growing Pains, Out of This World, Quantum Leap, Family Ties, The Twilight Zone, Tour of Duty, Snoops, Just Shoot Me, House, Without a Trace, Criminal Minds, The Mentalist, CSI: NY, three episodes of Castle and one episode of Arrow. Along with Ernie Hudson, he co-starred in the short-lived police drama series 10-8: Officers on Duty. He provided the voice of Alberto the Chihuahua in The Brave Little Toaster to the Rescue.

In 2010, he portrayed John Gotti in Sinatra Club, and Dante McDermott in the science-fiction film Nephilim. In 2011, he co-starred in the mystery thriller Escapee. Until 2018, Nucci played Mike Foster on the Freeform (formerly ABC Family) drama The Fosters.

Nucci portrayed Pop, the father of main character Felix Funicello, in the 2014 Lifetime television movie Wishin' and Hopin'.

Filmography

Film

Television

References

External links
 
 
 

1968 births
Living people
20th-century American male actors
21st-century American male actors
American male film actors
American male soap opera actors
American male television actors
American male voice actors
American people of Italian descent
American people of Moroccan descent
Italian emigrants to the United States
Male actors from California
People from the San Fernando Valley
Grant High School (Los Angeles) alumni